Elidir Sais (ca. 1190 – ca. 1240) was a Medieval Welsh language court poet from Anglesey His sobriquet Sais ("English") suggests he was conversant in the English language, something so unusual at the time that it earned him his nickname. It may indicate he had been forced to spend some year in exile in England.

The few surviving works by Elidir are mostly religious poems on the Holy Trinity, elegies on the death of several Welsh princes and a poem remonstrating Llywelyn ab Iorwerth, King of Gwynedd, whose aggressive policies he opposed.

Bibliography
J.E. Caerwyn Williams (ed.), Gwaith Meilyr Brydydd a'i ddisgynyddion (Cardiff, 1994). Includes the authoritative edition of the texts.
Henry Lewis (ed.), Hen Gerddi Crefyddol (Cardiff, 1974).

References

Welsh-language poets
13th-century Welsh poets
1190s births
1240s deaths
Year of birth uncertain